Netravati Bridge is on NH 66 in Mangalore, Dakshina Kannada, Karnataka built over Netravati River, which connects Mangalore city with its southern suburbs Thokottu, Ullal and Deralakatte. This bridge is also called as Ullal Bridge as this bridge is located in the town called Ullal in Mangalore taluk.

The total length of this bridge is 830 meters.

This bridge is a Karnataka - Kerala national highway NH 66. As part of the national highway it was 2 lane wide. When the roads were widened, the additional bridge was built parallel to old bridge and it was released to public on 20 March 2014. The new bridge has a total of 24 pillars including 18 pillars amidst the water and 6 pillars alongside the river. The height of each pillar is 33.25 feet tall.

Gallery

References

Bridges in Karnataka
Buildings and structures in Mangalore
Transport in Mangalore